The Columbus, Georgia Metropolitan Statistical Area, as defined by the United States Census Bureau and colloquially known as the Chattahoochee Valley, is an area consisting of six counties in Georgia and one county in Alabama, anchored by the city of Columbus. As of the 2010 census, the MSA had a population of 296,506 (though a July 1, 2016 estimate placed the population at 308,755). The Columbus metropolitan area is a component of the Columbus-Auburn-Opelika (GA-AL) Combined Statistical Area, a trading and marketing region. It is split between the Eastern Time Zone, the time zone the Georgia Counties of the metropolitan area are in, and the Central Time Zone, the time zone in Russell County, Alabama is in, thus making it the only metropolitan area in the United States to be split between multiple time zones.

Counties

Note: In 2018, the U.S. Census Bureau revised the official area definition of the Columbus, Georgia Metropolitan Statistical Area. Two additional Georgia counties, Stewart and Talbot, will be included in all statistics of the 2020 decennial census and in all annual population estimates after 2018.

Chattahoochee County, Georgia
Harris County, Georgia
Marion County, Georgia
Muscogee County, Georgia
Russell County, Alabama
Stewart County, Georgia
Talbot County, Georgia

Communities

Places with more than 180,000 inhabitants
Columbus, Georgia (principal city)

Places with 10,000 to 50,000 inhabitants
Cusseta, Georgia (includes Fort Benning)
Phenix City, Alabama

Places with 1,000 to 10,000 inhabitants
Buena Vista, Georgia
Hamilton, Georgia
Ladonia, Alabama (census-designated place)
Lumpkin, Georgia
Manchester, Georgia (partial)
Pine Mountain, Georgia (partial)
Richland, Georgia
West Point, Georgia (partial)

Places with less than 1,000 inhabitants

Geneva, Georgia
Hurtsboro, Alabama
Junction City, Georgia
Shiloh, Georgia
Talbotton, Georgia
Waverly Hall, Georgia
Woodland, Georgia

Unincorporated places
Box Springs, Georgia
Cataula, Georgia
Ellerslie, Georgia
Fortson, Georgia
Midland, Georgia
Glenville, Alabama
Juniper, Georgia
Louvale, Georgia
Omaha, Georgia

Demographics
As of the census of 2000, there were 281,768 people, 103,982 households, and 72,632 families residing within the MSA. The racial makeup of the MSA was 54.56% White, 40.21% African American, 0.40% Native American, 1.22% Asian, 0.14% Pacific Islander, 1.01% from other races, and 1.74% from two or more races. Hispanic or Latino of any race were 4.02% of the population.

The median income for a household in the MSA was $35,262, and the median income for a family was $40,065. Males had a median income of $29,196 versus $22,834 for females. The per capita income for the MSA was $16,410.

Combined Statistical Area

See also
Georgia census statistical areas
Alabama census statistical areas

References

 
Auburn metropolitan area, Alabama
Geography of Chattahoochee County, Georgia
Geography of Muscogee County, Georgia
Geography of Harris County, Georgia
Geography of Marion County, Georgia
Geography of Russell County, Alabama
Geography of Lee County, Alabama
Metropolitan areas of Georgia (U.S. state)
Metropolitan areas of Alabama
Regions of Georgia (U.S. state)
Regions of Alabama